Anthony Joseph Scotti (born December 22, 1939) is an American actor, television and film producer, and co-founder of Scotti Brothers Records. He is married to French singer Sylvie Vartan.

Early life
Scotti and his brother Ben both played football for the University of Maryland.

Career

Acting
Born in Newark, New Jersey, Scotti began his career as an actor, portraying Sharon Tate's love interest, Tony Polar, in the 1967 film, Valley of the Dolls. For his role in Valley, Scotti was required to sing and performed the song "Come Live With Me" in the film and on the film's soundtrack. Scotti's second and last acting appearance was the title role in an unaired 1968 television pilot film, Nick Quarry, based on the 1967 film, Tony Rome.

Scotti Bros.
While pursuing his film career, Tony Scotti had a mildly successful singing career with 3 low-chart national singles as a soloist, and two as the leader of Heaven Bound.

In 1971, Scotti abandoned his film career and joined the record production department of MGM as a senior vice president. In 1974, Scotti, along with older brother Ben, formed Ben Scotti Productions, a music marketing firm. The company eventually branched out into television and produced the pop music series, America's Top 10. The success of the show prompted the brothers to form a television syndication company, All American Television in 1981. The company would go on to distribute shows like Baywatch and Acapulco H.E.A.T.

In the mid-1980s, the company began producing movies under Scotti Brothers Pictures and would go on to release Eye of the Tiger and Lady Beware.

Filmography

Film

Television

In popular culture
Scotti signed pop music parodist "Weird Al" Yankovic to the Scotti Bros. label in 1981. Forty years later, Scotti was portrayed by Yankovic himself in the 2022 film Weird: The Al Yankovic Story; the film is a satirical biopic loosely based on Yankovic's own life (in which "Weird Al" is portrayed by Daniel Radcliffe).

References

External links
 

1939 births
Living people
Male actors from Newark, New Jersey
American male film actors
Film producers from New Jersey
American male singers
American music industry executives
American male television actors
American television producers
Businesspeople from Newark, New Jersey
Maryland Terrapins football players